Ishemgul (İşemğol) is a rural locality (a selo) and the administrative centre of Novochebenkinsky Selsoviet, Zianchurinsky District, Bashkortostan, Russia. The population was 671 as of 2010. There are 10 streets.

Geography 
Ishemgul is located 27 km west of Isyangulovo (the district's administrative centre) by road. Novye Chebenki is the nearest rural locality.

References 

Rural localities in Zianchurinsky District